Clickky is a full-stack platform for advertisers and publishers, which offers programmatic, performance and video solutions. Currently, Clickky focuses on the developing of its own SSP and RTB Marketplace.  

The company was founded by Vadim Rogovskiy in 2010. Clickky has offices in New York, Moscow, Mumbai and Beijing, with the R&D office in Odessa, Ukraine. According to the Dealbook of Ukraine, Clickky made the list of Ukrainian IT companies with the most revenue abroad.

History
The company evolved from Clickburner ad network, which was founded in 2010 by Vadim Rogovskiy.

In 2013, Clickky shifted its focus to mobile market, offering solutions for mobile app developers.

In May, 2015 Clickky received $2M from iTech Capital, a venture capital firm that focuses on growth investments in digital economy businesses. The company has shown a  
1,498% growth over the four years, reaching €3.3 M revenue.

Activities
Clickky holds an annual Mobile Beach Conference — a two-day mobile marketing  and tech event, taking place in Odessa, Ukraine.
In 2017, Mobile Beach Conference gathered over 800 mobile marketing professionals from 29 countries. The event also hosts Startup Alley, a competition for tech startups.

References

External links
Official Website
Backlink Building

Digital marketing companies